Richard Clerk was a bishop in England and Ireland in the mid 15th century.

A priest in the Diocese of Meath, he was Bishop of Ross in Ireland from 1434 to 1448. He also acted as a suffragan bishop in the dioceses of London (1434–41); Canterbury (1439–65), and Salisbury (1454).

References

Bibliography

Pre-Reformation bishops of Ross (Ireland)